Angeliki Nikolopoulou (born 2 May 1991) is a Greek professional basketball player who plays for Olympiacos and Greece women's national basketball team. She is part of the Greek national team in Eurobasket 2017.

References

External links
FIBA profile

Living people
Greek women's basketball players
Olympiacos Women's Basketball players
1991 births
Basketball players from Athens
Point guards